The Ministry of Relief & Rehabilitation is a Ministry of the Government of Maharashtra. 
state.

The Ministry is headed by a cabinet level Minister. Eknath Shinde is Current Chief Minister of Maharashtra and Minister of Relief & Rehabilitation Government of Maharashtra.

Head office

List of Cabinet Ministers

List of Ministers of State

References 

Government of Maharashtra
Government ministries of Maharashtra